Thomas James Brown (born September 28, 1970) is the tenth and current bishop of the Episcopal Diocese of Maine in The Episcopal Church.

Biography 
Brown graduated with a Bachelor of Science from Western Michigan University in 1988. After receiving his Master of Divinity from the Church Divinity School of the Pacific in 1997, Brown was ordained priest on January 18, 1998. In 1997 he became associate priest at the Church of St John the Evangelist in San Francisco and director of alumni and church relations at Church Divinity School of the Pacific. He served as rector of St Michael's Church in Brattleboro, Vermont between 2000 and 2009. In 2009 he became rector of the Parish of the Epiphany in Winchester, Massachusetts.

He was elected at a special diocesan convention on February 9, 2019, to succeed Bishop Stephen T. Lane. He was consecrated the tenth bishop of Maine on June 22, 2019. He is the first openly gay bishop to lead the diocese and only the third to lead any diocese in the United States.

See also
List of bishops of the Episcopal Church in the United States of America
List of Episcopal bishops of the United States

References

Living people
Bishops in Maine
LGBT Anglican bishops
1970 births
People from Ontonagon County, Michigan
Western Michigan University alumni
Episcopal bishops of Maine